Sportvereniging Roda Juliana Combinatie Kerkrade, also known as Roda JC Kerkrade or commonly Roda JC  or  Roda, is a Dutch professional football club based in Kerkrade, Netherlands. Roda JC Kerkrade plays in the Eerste Divisie. The club was founded by a merger between Rapid JC and Roda Sport in 1962. They were placed in the Eerste Divisie, and after a relegation they were promoted back to the top division in 1973, where they would stay for 41 years until being relegated in 2014. In 2009–10, they added Kerkrade to the name to create brand awareness and get financial support.

Roda JC is known as the "coal-miner's club"; fans of archrival club MVV, from the provincial capital of Maastricht, say those words condescendingly. However, in Kerkrade and the surrounding area, they are said with pride and respect, although the last Dutch coal mines were closed in the 1970s.

Roda JC's club honours include seven European campaigns and six KNVB Cup finals, of which they won two. One of its predecessors in club's "family tree" of mergers, Rapid JC, were champions of the Netherlands in 1956. Ten out of eleven players on that Rapid JC team were coal miners.

History

Merge (1955–1962)
Roda JC Kerkrade came into being as the result of a merger of several football clubs from Kerkrade. In 1954, SV Kerkrade (established 1926) and SV Bleijerheide (1914) merged to form Roda Sport. That same year, Rapid '54 (1954) and amateur club Juliana (1910) merged to form Rapid JC. Rapid JC was one of the most successful clubs of that time, winning the Championship play-off in 1956. In later years they would only finish in the top 10 once, when they finished second in the 1958–59 season. Roda Sport, however, were relegated to the Tweede Divisie and stayed there until the latest merger with Rapid JC, to form Roda JC.

Struggling and staying at the top division (1963–94)
After the merger they began in the Eerste Divisie in the 1962–63 season, but were relegated the same season after finishing 16th. The following season they almost achieved promotion again, but they lost in the play-off and remained in the Tweede Divisie for eight years. After their return to the Eerste Divisie, it only took a further two seasons before they were promoted to the Eredivisie, when they finished first.

The club are finally in the premier division, but did not manage to qualify for a European competition even though they finished near the top several times. They only qualified for Europe once when they lost in the finals of the KNVB Cup in 1975, but they lost in the first round, 5–3 on aggregate, to Anderlecht. In the 1986–87 season they finally finished high enough for the European Cup play-offs in the Netherlands, but lost their place to Utrecht. One year later they finished 15th and struggled to avoid relegation to the Eerste Divisie. They did, however, reach the finals of the KNVB Cup. Since PSV already had a place in Europe by winning the Eredivisie, Roda JC also earned a place in the European Cup. With the financial backing of entrepreneur Nol Hendriks, this was the club's most memorable European campaign, when Roda made it through the winter in the European Cup Winners' Cup before succumbing to the superb strikers of Bulgarian Sredets Sofia, Hristo Stoichkov, Lyuboslav Penev and Emil Kostadinov, who became superstars in Europe's major football leagues. Two years later, they finished fifth twice, but only once gained a place in a European competition. They did well in the KNVB Cup in 1990–91, reaching the semi-finals, and a year later reached the finals.

Dutch and European success (1994–2002)
Since 1994, the club has managed to achieve several successes both in Europe and the Netherlands during the Nol Hendriks era. Most notable was their second-place finish in the Eredivisie in 1994–95. They also won the KNVB Cup twice, in 1996–97 and 1999–2000. As a result of these successes, they qualified for several European competitions. In the 1997–98 UEFA Cup Winners' Cup, Roda was eliminated in the quarter-finals by Vicenza 1–9 on aggregate. Roda's most memorable European match was played on 28 February 2002. After a 0–1 defeat at the hands of Milan in Kerkrade, Roda caused panic at San Siro by winning the return leg by the same score (0-1). The only goal scored during this match was made by Mark Luijpers. Roda even took the lead in the penalty shoot-out, but ended up losing the series, only being one penalty away from eliminating Milan.

Since then, Roda have only qualified twice for the UEFA Intertoto Cup, in 2003–04 and 2004–05. In later years, they did manage to qualify for the play-offs but never won it.

Roda's position in Dutch football is best illustrated by their history in the KNVB Cup. Roda were good enough to make it to six finals, but the first three times and the last time the opponent in the final was one of the "Big Three" – and Roda went home with the silver medal: PSV won in 1976 and 1988 and Feyenoord in 1992 and 2008. However, in two of the club's cup finals, a non-Big Three side was the opponent. Both times, the cup went to Kerkrade: Heerenveen were defeated in 1997 and NEC in 2000.

Decline (2002–2013)
Since 1992, Roda have been in discussions with neighbours Fortuna Sittard, as well as MVV and VVV, with a view to merging to form a new club, named FC Limburg. A statement of intent was published by Roda and Fortuna in November 2008 and in early 2009 financial backing was found for the scheme. All these attempts, however, floundered.

In 2008, the club gained its final notable success by reaching the KNVB Cup final. In the final, opponent and home side Feyenoord proved to be too strong, winning 2–0. One year later, the two teams met again in De Kuip for the final round of the 2008–09 Eredivisie season. Roda JC needed a win to avoid direct relegation, and against all odds, Roda JC defeated Feyenoord to qualify for the promotion/relegation play-offs. Roda eventually won the play-offs, defeating Cambuur in a penalty shoot-out.

In 2010, the club added "Kerkrade" to its name, so the new full name of the sports club is now Roda JC Kerkrade. This was one of the conditions set by the municipality of Kerkrade, in return for their sponsorship.

Roda JC finished in 16th position in the 2012–13 Eredivisie season and were therefore again forced to participate in the play-offs. The Coal Miners came out victorious again after a late free-kick winner by Mark-Jan Fledderus against Sparta Rotterdam, extending the club's stay at the highest level for another season.

Relegations and Eerste Divisie (2014–2018)
Roda JC finished 18th in the 2013–14 Eredivisie and were relegated in May 2014, ending a 41-year period of football at the highest national level. However, they bounced back from the Eerste Divisie on their first attempt after defeating NAC after extra time in a promotion/relegation play-off final.

In January 2017, Dubai-based Swiss-Russian businessman Aleksei Korotaev took a minority interest in the club and brought former French international Nicolas Anelka with him in an advisory role. After Korotaev was jailed for alleged fraud in Dubai later that year, Anelka became not involved with the club anymore.

The club was relegated for a second time in their history in May 2018, after finishing the season in 16th place and subsequently losing 1–2 on aggregate to Eerste Divisie side Almere City in the promotion/relegation play-offs.

Eerste Divisie (2018–present (2022))

After some turbulent years, the club now gained more stability with players staying longer and having a manager in the likes of Jurgen Streppel who brings continuity. The positions they finish in the league are becoming higher every season, as in the 2021-2022 season they qualified for promotion play-offs, but lost to Excelsior Rotterdam in the quarter finals.

Stadium
After the establishment of the club, Roda JC Kerkrade played in Sportpark Kaalheide with a capacity of 21,500 spectators. Its current stadium is the Parkstad Limburg Stadion, an all-seater stadium with a capacity of 19,979. It was opened on 15 August 2000 with a match against Spanish side Real Zaragoza, which ended in a 2–2 draw.

Honours
Before their merger, Rapid JC had won the top league title once, in the 1955–56 season.

Runners-up

Domestic results
Below is a table with Roda JC's domestic results since the introduction of the Eredivisie in 1956.

Players and staff

First-team squad

Current staff

Former players

Australia
  Tomi Juric 
  Zeljko Kalac
Belgium
  Davy De Fauw
  Bob Peeters
  Tom Soetaers
  Joos Valgaeren 
  Peter Van Houdt
Bosnia and Herzegovina
  Ognjen Gnjatić 
  Adnan Šećerović 
Denmark
  John Eriksen
  Mads Junker
  Sten Ziegler
Estonia
  Andres Oper
Ghana
  Richmond Boakye 
Hungary
  Tamás Kádár 
  Boldizsár Bodor 
Ivory Coast
  Arouna Koné
  Cheick Tioté 
Netherlands
  Kees Bregman
  Dick Advocaat
  Mitchell Donald
  Ron Jans
  Ruud Vormer
New Zealand
  Ivan Vicelich
Poland
  Przemysław Tytoń
Portugal
  Danilo Pereira
Serbia
  Jagoš Vuković

Coaches

Sponsors

Supporters

Although not the most vocal, the supporters of Roda JC are generally considered to be among the most loyal and well behaved in the Netherlands. In the early days of the club, Kaalheide was the club's home ground. Initially, supporters could roam free over the terraces. However, in the 1970s, fences were placed between the various sections, preventing supporters to move from one stand to the other. The fanatical supporters decided to unite at the covered north side stand, creating an old fashioned, atmospheric stand. Kaalheide became an infamous stadium for visiting teams.

Since moving to the Parkstad Limburg Stadium in the summer of 2000, the more fanatical supporters can be found behind the goal on the West side. The West Stand was renamed 'Koempel Tribune' (Miner Stand) in September 2014 to honour the fans who remained loyal to the club after the relegation four months earlier.

Since 1989, there is a close friendship between the supporters of Alemannia Aachen and Roda JC Kerkrade. Fans of both clubs regularly visit each other's games.

Rivalries

Roda JC has three provincial rivals, namely Fortuna Sittard, MVV and VVV-Venlo. The arch rival is MVV, the team from the provincial capital of Maastricht. The Roda JC-MVV rivalry is considered to be the number one rivalry in the Province of Limburg by both sets of supporters.

During the 1990s, the rivalry between Roda JC and Fortuna Sittard intensified, as both clubs were relatively successful during that period. Fanatical supporters of both clubs clash regularly ever since. The increased rivalry also created animosity between hooligans of Roda JC and the Belgian Limburg club Genk.

Due to the distance between Kerkrade and Venlo, the rivalry with VVV-Venlo is considered to be a minor one by the majority of the Roda JC supporters.

See also
 Sporting Limburg

References

External links
 Official Roda JC Kerkrade website 
 Site about Roda JC Players 
 West Side Ultras 
 Koempels Pleasure Dome 
 1st Official Supporters Fanclub 
 Fanproject Kerkrade 98 
 Parkstadlimburg-stadion 
 1990s Review 
 Supportersclub Roda (SCR) 
 Roda United 

 
Football clubs in the Netherlands
Association football clubs established in 1962
1962 establishments in the Netherlands
Football clubs in Kerkrade
South Limburg (Netherlands)